Dyschirius roubali is a species of ground beetle in the subfamily Scaritinae. It was described by Maran in 1938.

References

roubali
Beetles described in 1938